Johannes Põllupüü (1 November 1889 Kiviloo, Harju County – 20 October 1946 , Sweden) was an Estonian politician. He was a member of Estonian Constituent Assembly. He was a member of the assembly since 18 August 1920. He replaced Gustav Küjen.

References

1889 births
1946 deaths
Members of the Estonian Constituent Assembly
Estonian World War II refugees
Estonian emigrants to Sweden
University of Tartu alumni
People from Raasiku Parish
Burials at Skogskyrkogården